Adam Bomb (born Adam Brenner, 14 August 1963) is an American guitarist who worked with artists like TKO, Black 'N Blue, Steel Pulse, John Paul Jones, and Michael Monroe. His stage name is a play on the name Atom Bomb.

Early
In 1979, Adam Bomb and future Queensrÿche frontman Geoff Tate started a cover band called Tyrant. Later, Bomb joined the band TKO, with who he recorded the album In Your Face. In 1982, Bomb flew to LA and unsuccessfully auditioned for Kiss. He then moved to Hollywood and shared an apartment with Jeffrey Isbell (better known as Izzy Stradlin). He met neighbor, Tommy Thayer, a guitarist for the band Movie Star (which later evolved into Black N' Blue), who came up with the original idea that he should call his act 'Adam Bomb'. Movie Star opened for TKO at The Showbox in 1983. Adam recorded his first demos with producer Rick Keefer while playing gigs with Steeler as a replacement. One year later, Bomb recorded songs with drummer Chuck Ruff and bassist Cliff Williams of AC/DC, and finally finished his album Fatal Attraction.

The Adam Bomb Band

Bomb signed a management deal with Leber Krebs, and moved to NYC to start the Adam Bomb Band with former Billy Idol drummer Gregg Gerson, Billy Idol/Riot bassist Phil Feit, and Aerosmith guitarist Jimmy Crespo. They recorded Fatal Attraction in 1985. The band later moved again to Los Angeles, and for a time, opened for bands Armored Saint and Metallica.

The follow-up contained mainly left over material from their debut release, and so Pure S.E.X. (1990) had indifferent reviews.

2011
In 2011, Adam Bomb bassist Paul Del Bello and drummer Violet Cannibal had started recording on a CDs  Rock On, Rock Hard, Rock Animal. The album had cover songs as well as original material. Bomb recorded "Affection" (written by Little Steven), continued touring, and lived around Europe occasionally.  In July 2016, he recorded a single with drummer Bobby Reynolds, keyboardist Alan St Jon, saxophonist Arno Hecht, and Phil Feit.

Current
Adam Bomb – vocals, guitar 
"Koza Fagoth" Konrad Kozerawski (PL) – bass guitar,  
Leo Cakolli (FR) – drums

Past
Jimmy Crespo – guitar (1984–1985) (Aerosmith, Billy Squier), Rod Stewart,
Stevie Klasson – guitar (1988–1989) (Johnny Thunders)
Kurtis Schefter – guitar (1988)(Allanah Myles)
Alan St. John – keyboards (1996–1998) (Alice Cooper, Billy Squier, Foreigner
Phil Feit - bass (1984-1987, 1990-1992, 1995) (Riot, Billy Idol, Joan Jett)
Kenny Aaronson – bass (1996–1998) (Dust, Rick Derringer, Billy Idol, Joan Jett)
Bobby Chouinard – drums (1987–1997) (Billy Squier, Alice Cooper, Gary Moore)
Sandy Slavin – drums (1985–1991) (Riot, Ace Frehley)
Gregg Gerson – drums (1984–1985, 1986–1987) (Billy Idol, Mayday, Sven Gali)
Amy Madden – bass (1987–1990) (Jon Paris)
Jeff Consi – drums (1999–2000) (Nuno Bettencourt)
Dennis Marcotte aka KK McKay – bass ( 1999–2002 )
Thommy Price – drums (Atomic Playboys, Billy Idol, Joan Jett)
Kiki Tornado – drums (2003–2004) (Sex Museum) and 2006 tour
Gorka Alegre – bass (2000–2006) (Baron Rojo) (Different tours from 2000 to 2006)
Luigi Pellegrino – drums (Armed Venus)(Tour 2006)
Marco "DaVinci" Chiocchetti – drums, (2007–2008) (Motorcity Brags, The Beat Holes)
Craig "Wookie" McGhee – drums, (2008–2009)
Bobby Reynolds – drums, (2003, 2006.2007 2009 2012, 2013 )
Folkert Beukers – drums, (2009–2010, 2014 to present)
Paul Del Bello – bass guitar, (2006–2012, 2014) (Steven Adler, Dobermann)
Yoann "Bonzo" Blond – drums, (2012-2013) (Toys in the forest, Purple Jane)
Violet Cannibal – drums, (2010–2012)(2016)(2018) Vice Squad The Femones, Joan ov Arc, Uniting the Elements, The Kut, The Red Paintings, Paul Roland The Sex Pissed Dolls

Discography

Solo

Studio
 1984 – Fatal Attraction
 1989 – Pure SEX.
 1993 – Grave New World
 1999 – Get Animal
 2000 – Get Animal 2
 2001 – New York Times
 2003 – Third World Roar
 2004 – Acoustica
 2005 – Rock Like Fuck
 2009 – Crazy Motherfucker
 2012 – Rock On, Rock Hard, Rock Animal

Comps
 2004 – Bone Yard

With TKO
 1981 – In Your Face

With Black 'N Blue
 1985 – Without Love

With Steel Pulse
 1988 – State of Emergency

With John Paul Jones
 2001 – The Thunderthief

With Michael Monroe
 2002 – Take Them and Break Them
 2003 – Whatcha Want
 2008 – Pirates of the Baltic Sea

References

External links

 Official website

1963 births
American heavy metal guitarists
Guitarists from Washington (state)
Living people